Piero Carninci is an Italian geneticist who graduated from the University of Trieste in 1989 and from 1990 to 1995 was an inventor of various DNA sequences and extractions. Later on he moved to Japan where he worked in RIKEN. He became Omics Science Center director in 2008 which was RIKEN division. Currently he specializes CAGE, leads the FANTOM project, and is also a writer of over 200 scientific papers. In 2014, he won the Chen Award of Excellence. In 2016, he became a recipient of the Shimadzu Prize.

References

External links

Living people
20th-century births
Italian geneticists
University of Trieste alumni
Year of birth missing (living people)